The FIS Nordic World Ski Championships 1925 was the 1st official FIS Nordic World Ski Championships and took place between February 4–14, 1925 in Johannisbad (Janské Lázně), Czechoslovakia.

The event was originally a Rendezvous race organised by the International Ski Federation (FIS), but were given official World Championship status at FIS' 25th congress in 1965.

Men's cross country

18 km 
February 12, 1925

50 km 
February 14, 1925

Men's Nordic combined

Individual 
February 4, 1925

Men's ski jumping

Individual large hill 
February 12, 1925

Medal table

References

External links
FIS 1925 Cross country results
FIS 1925 Nordic combined results
FIS 1925 Ski jumping results
Hansen, Hermann & Sveen, Knut. (1996) VM på ski '97. Alt om ski-VM 1925-1997 Trondheim: Addresseavisens Forlag. p. 33. . 

FIS Nordic World Ski Championships
1925 in Nordic combined
1925 in Czechoslovak sport
Skiing competitions in Czechoslovakia
International sports competitions hosted by Czechoslovakia
February 1925 sports events
Nordic skiing competitions in Czechoslovakia